Ajmeera Rekha Nayak (born 19 February 1974) is an Indian politician and a legislator of Telangana Legislature. She won as MLA from Khanapur on Telangana Rashtra Samithi ticket.

Early life
She was born in Hyderabad, Telangana to K. Shankar Chauhan and K. Shyamala Bai. She did her schooling in Sanathnagar. Her father worked in BHEL and her mother was a state government employee. She did her BA from Vanita Mahavidyalaya and MA (sociology) from Osmania University. She also completed her LLB from Padala Ram Reddy College.

Career
She was a member of ZPTC. She lost as MLA in 2009 as independent and won for the first time in 2014 on TRS ticket. Again she won for the 2nd time in 2018 Assembly elections with TRS ticket.

References

People from Telangana
Living people
Telangana Rashtra Samithi politicians
Telangana MLAs 2018–2023
Telangana MLAs 2014–2018
1974 births